Domenic Carmine "Dom" DiBerardino (born July 13, 1942) is a Canadian retired professional hockey player who played 588 games in the Eastern Hockey League with the Philadelphia Ramblers, Clinton Comets, Jacksonville Rockets, Nashville Dixie Flyers, and Greensboro Generals.

External links
 

1942 births
Living people
Sportspeople from Timmins
Ice hockey people from Ontario
Philadelphia Ramblers players
Clinton Comets players
Jacksonville Rockets players
Nashville Dixie Flyers players
Greensboro Generals players
Canadian expatriate ice hockey players in the United States
Canadian ice hockey right wingers